Portugal competed at the 2016 Summer Olympics in Rio de Janeiro, Brazil, from 5 to 21 August 2016. Portuguese athletes had appeared in every edition of the Summer Olympic Games since the nation's debut in 1912.

The Olympic Committee of Portugal fielded a team of 92 athletes, 62 men and 30 women, across 16 sports at the Games. It was the nation's second-largest ever delegation sent to the Olympics, falling short of the record for the most athletes (107) achieved in Atlanta 1996 by nearly 20 percent. Men's football was the only team-based sport in which Portugal had representatives at these Games, returning to the Olympic scene after being absent from the previous two editions. Portugal also marked its Olympic debut in golf (new to the 2016 Games), as well as its return to taekwondo after 8 years, and slalom canoeing and tennis after 16 years.

The Portuguese roster featured 31 returning Olympians, including three past medalists: triple jumper and Beijing 2008 champion Nelson Évora and sprint canoeing duo Fernando Pimenta and Emanuel Silva, who brought home the nation's only medal, a silver, at London 2012. Windsurfer and multiple-time European champion João Rodrigues, who was selected as the nation's flag bearer in the opening ceremony, set a historic milestone as the first Portuguese athlete to participate in his seventh and final Olympics.  Pistol shooter João Costa, the oldest of the team (aged 52), and Laser sailor Gustavo Lima joined the list of the nation's athletes who attended their fifth Games. Other notable competitors on the Portuguese roster included world-ranked judoka and four-time Olympian Telma Monteiro, road cycling pro Rui Costa, European Games taekwondo champion Rui Bragança, and sprinter Lorène Bazolo, who ran for her native Congo in London four years earlier.

Portugal left Rio de Janeiro with only a bronze medal won by Monteiro in the women's 57 kg, saving its pride from the humiliation of returning empty-handed for the first time since Barcelona 1992. Several Portuguese athletes advanced further to the finals of their respective sporting events, but came closest to the nation's medal haul, including Evora (sixth, men's triple jump), Pimenta (fifth, men's K-1 1000 m), Silva and his new partner João Ribeiro (fourth, men's K-2 1000 m), and João José Pereira, who finished fifth in the men's triathlon.

Medalists

Competitors

| width=78% align=left valign=top |
The following is the list of number of competitors participating in the Games. Note that reserves in fencing, field hockey, football, and handball are not counted as athletes:

Athletics

Portuguese athletes achieved qualifying standards in several events (maximum of three athletes per event).
On May 31, 2016, the Portuguese Athletics Federation (FPA) named the first batch of track and road athletes, all competing in both marathon and race walking, to the Olympic roster, with João Vieira remarkably going to his fourth Games. The final roster of 25 athletes (9 men and 16 women) was officially announced on July 12, 2016. Eight days later, the Portuguese federation announced that Yazaldes Nascimento would be unable to participate in the men's 100 metres due to injury, which had already left him out of the delegation for the 2016 European Athletics Championships.

Track & road events
Men

Women

Field events
Men

Women

Badminton

Portugal has qualified two badminton players for each of the following events into the Olympic tournament. London 2012 Olympians Pedro Martins and Telma Santos picked up one of the spare athlete berths each from host nation Brazil and from the Tripartite Commission as the next highest-ranked eligible players in their respective singles events based on the BWF World Rankings as of 5 May 2016.

Canoeing

Slalom
Portugal has qualified one boat in the men's slalom C-1 for the Games, as the International Canoe Federation accepted the nation's request to claim a spare berth freed by Great Britain. The slot was awarded to José Carvalho, who finished among the top 20 canoeists at the 2015 World Championships.

Sprint
Portuguese canoeists initially qualified four boats for the Games through the 2015 ICF Canoe Sprint World Championships. Meanwhile, one additional boat was awarded in the women's K-1 200 m by virtue of a top-two national finish at the 2016 European Qualification Regatta in Duisburg, Germany.

Men

Women

Qualification Legend: FA = Qualify to final (medal); FB = Qualify to final B (non-medal)

Cycling

Road
Portuguese riders qualified for a maximum of four quota places in the men's Olympic road race by virtue of their top 15 final national ranking in the 2015 UCI World Tour. On 4 July 2016, the Portuguese Cycling Federation announced the selection of former Olympians André Cardoso, Rui Costa and Nelson Oliveira, and of 2016 national road race champion José Mendes, who would take part in his first Olympics.

Mountain biking
Portuguese mountain bikers qualified for two men's quota places into the Olympic cross-country race, as a result of the nation's eleventh place in the UCI Olympic Ranking List of 25 May 2016. On 9 June 2016, the Portuguese Cycling Federation announced it had selected Tiago Ferreira and London 2012 Olympian David Rosa as the nation's representatives in this event.

Equestrian

Portugal has entered one jumping rider into the Olympic equestrian competition by virtue of a top national finish from South Western Europe in the individual FEI Olympic Rankings.

Jumping

Football

Men's tournament

Portugal qualified a team of 18 players for the Olympic men's football tournament by reaching the semifinals at the 2015 UEFA European Under-21 Championship in the Czech Republic.

Team roster

Group play

Quarterfinal

Golf

Portugal has entered two golfers into the Olympic tournament. Ricardo Gouveia (world no. 125) and José-Filipe Lima (world no. 392) qualified directly among the top 60 players for the men's event based on the IGF World Rankings as of July 11, 2016.

Gymnastics

Artistic
Portugal has entered two artistic gymnasts into the Olympic competition. Gustavo Simões and Ana Filipa Martins claimed their Olympic spots respectively in the men's and women's apparatus and individual all-around events at the Olympic Test Event in Rio de Janeiro. On 22 July, however, the Portuguese federation announced that Simões would fail its debut Olympic participation in Rio de Janeiro due to a foot injury in a preparation event.

Women

Trampoline
Portugal has entered two trampoline gymnasts into the Olympic competition. Diogo Abreu and two-time Olympian Ana Rente claimed their Olympic spots respectively in the men's and women's events at the Olympic Test Event in Rio de Janeiro.

Judo

Portugal has qualified a total of six judokas for each of the following weight classes at the Games. Five of them (three men and two women), with Telma Monteiro remarkably going to her fourth Olympics, were ranked among the top 22 eligible judokas for men and top 14 for women in the IJF World Ranking List of May 30, 2016, while Nuno Saraiva at men's lightweight (73 kg) earned a continental quota spot from the European region as the highest-ranked Portuguese judoka outside of direct qualifying position.

Sailing

Portuguese sailors have qualified one boat in each of the following classes through the 2014 ISAF Sailing World Championships, the individual fleet Worlds, and European qualifying regattas. On December 17, 2015, three Portuguese sailors had been named to the 2016 Olympic team, including seven-time Olympian João Rodrigues in men's windsurfing. Meanwhile, single-handed sailors Gustavo Lima (Laser), who confirmed his fifth Olympic appearance, and 2012 Olympian Sara Carmo (Laser Radial) had claimed their Olympic spots at the Princess Sofia Trophy Regatta to round out the selection of the sailing squad.

M = Medal race; EL = Eliminated – did not advance into the medal race

Shooting

Portugal has qualified one shooter to compete in the men's pistol events by virtue of his best finish at the 2015 ISSF World Cup series and other selection competitions, as long as he obtained a minimum qualifying score (MQS) by March 31, 2016.

Qualification Legend: Q = Qualify for the next round; q = Qualify for the bronze medal (shotgun)

Swimming

Portuguese swimmers have so far achieved qualifying standards in the following events (up to a maximum of two swimmers in each event at the Olympic Qualifying Time (OQT), and potentially one at the Olympic Selection Time (OST)):

Table tennis

Portugal has entered three athletes into the table tennis competition at the Games. Two-time Olympians Tiago Apolónia and Marcos Freitas, along with Chinese-born Yu Fu, secured Olympic spots each in the men's and women's singles, respectively, by winning their group final matches at the European Qualification Tournament in Halmstad, Sweden. Meanwhile, Shao Jieni was automatically selected among the top 22 eligible players to join Yu in the women's singles based on the ITTF Olympic Rankings.

Remarkably going with Apolonia and Freitas to their third Olympics, João Monteiro was awarded the third spot to build the men's team for the Games by virtue of a top 10 national finish in the ITTF Olympic Rankings.

Taekwondo

Portugal entered one athlete into the taekwondo competition for the first time at the Olympics since 2008. European Games champion Rui Bragança qualified automatically for the men's flyweight category (58 kg) by finishing in the top 6 WTF Olympic rankings.

Tennis

Portugal has entered two tennis players into the Olympic tournament, signifying the nation's return to the sport for the first time since 2000. João Sousa (world no. 30) qualified directly for the men's singles event as one of the top 56 eligible players in the ATP World Rankings as of June 6, 2016, while Gastão Elias (world no. 88) secured an additional Olympic place
as a result of the withdrawal of players with higher ranking. On the second day of the Games, the withdrawal of the German pair from the men's doubles event allowed Elias and Sousa to enter the tournament as alternates.

Triathlon 

Portugal has qualified a total of three triathletes for the Olympics. Miguel Arraiolos, João José Pereira, and João Pedro Silva were ranked among the top 40 eligible triathletes in the men's event based on the ITU Olympic Qualification List as of May 15, 2016.

See also
Portugal at the 2016 Summer Paralympics

References

External links 

 

Olympics
Nations at the 2016 Summer Olympics
2016